Rising Star or Rising Stars may refer to:

People and characters
 Rising Star, a pseudonym of the DJ Armin van Buuren
 Aurvandil, the Rising Star, or Morning Star; in Germanic mythology

Books
 Rising Stars (comic), a comic book series by J. Michael Straczynski
 Rising Stars of Manga, an English-language comic anthology published by TOKYOPOP from 2002 to 2008
 Rising Star: The Making of Barack Obama, a 2017 biography of Barack Obama by David Garrow
 Rising Stars, a British educational publisher owned by Hodder Education

Film and TV
 Rising Stars (film), a 2010 American teen musical film
 "Rising Star" (Babylon 5), a fourth-season episode of the science fiction television series Babylon 5
 Rising Star (franchise), an international music reality television series in a number of countries
Rising Star (France), 2014 French reality show on M6
Rising Star Indonesia 
Rising Star (American TV series), 2014 American reality show on ABC

Music
 Rising Star (album), a 2009 album by Taegoon
Brit Award for Rising Star, an award recognizing up and coming talent

Places
 Rising Star, Texas, USA
 Rising Star Academy, an Islamic School in New Jersey, United States
 Rising Star Cave, an archaeological site in the Cradle of Humankind, South Africa
 Rising Starr Middle School, a school in Fayette County, Georgia, United States

Ships
 PS Rising Star, a paddle steamer warship launched in 1818
 Rising Star (ship, 1991), a tugboat operated by the United States Air Force

Fictional ships
 Rising Star, a fictional starship featured in the original Battlestar Galactica episode "Murder on the Rising Star"

Sport
 AFL Rising Star, an award given to the best young player in the Australian Football League
 AFL Women's Rising Star, an award given to the best young player in the AFL Women's
 Rising Stars F.C., a Nigerian football club
 Rising Stars Challenge, a basketball all-star game
 Rising Stars cricket team, a cricket team based in Zimbabwe

Others
 Rising Star Casino Resort, a casino hotel in Indiana
 Rising Star Games, a video game publishing company

See also
 Catch a Rising Star (disambiguation)
 Rising Star Award (disambiguation)
 Morning Star (disambiguation)